HDMS Det Store Bælt was a frigate of the Royal Dano-Norwegian Navy, launched in 1782. In 1800, she was sold to the Danish Asiatic Company and renamed Holsteen.

Construction and design
Det Store Bælt was constructed at Bodenhoffs Plads to a design by Henrik Gerner. She was the first of at least three frigates constructed for the navy at Andreas Bodenhoff's dockyard. The next were Friderichsværn (1783) and Hvide Ørn (1784). Set Store Bælt was launched on 22 June 1782 and the construction was completed in August 1783.

Her complement was 274 men. Her armerment was 36 12-oiybder guns.

Career

Naval service
She was commissioned in the Royal Danish Navy and served for some years as the cadet training ship in the North and Baltic seas. In 1793 she was patrolling in the North Sea under the command of A J Herbst, and in 1795 and 1797 was part of a joint Danish/Swedish squadron enforcing neutrality and protecting trade. In 1797, she was under the command of Hans Lindholm.

DAC service
In 1800 the Royal Danish Navy sold Store Bælt for 7,800 rigsdaler  to the Danish Asiatic Company who renamed her Holsten

From her home port of Copenhagen Holsten completed three voyages to the East Indies:
1800 - 1801
1801 - 1803 under captain Jan Hendrick Helsding
1804 - 1805 also under captain Jan Hendrick Helsding.

On 12 June 1805 Holstein, Helfding, master, was reported off Dover on her way from Bengal to Copenhagen. It appears that it was on a fourth voyage that she met her fate.

Fate
A report in the Madras Courier dated 10 February 1807 stated that the Danish company's ship Holstein was sailing from Copenhagen to Serampore when she was dismasted off Ceylon. She sailed to Mauritius for repairs. On reaching Mauritius (then known as Isle de France) Holsten was condemned as unseaworthy.

The DAC replaced her, in Secember 1806, with the purchase from the French at Mauritius the recently captured East Indiaman , which the Company then renamed Holsten.

Namesakes
At least two other ships have borne similar names"
Store Bælt (1875–1912), a gunboat.
Storebælt (1995–1999), a patrol vessel.

Notes

References

Citations
Balsved - Danish Naval History website
Royal Danish Navy Museum database List of Ships 
T. A. Topsøe-Jensen og Emil Marquard (1935) "Officerer i den dansk-norske Søetat 1660-1814 og den danske Søetat 1814-1932“. Two volumes. Download here .

1782 ships
Ships built in Copenhagen
Ships designed by Henrik Gerner
Frigates of the Royal Danish Navy
Ships of the Danish Asiatic Company